Garra tibanica is a species of ray-finned fish in the genus Garra.

References

Garra
Fish described in 1941